The 2003–04 season was PAOK Football Club’s 78th in existence and the club’s 45th consecutive season in the top flight of Greek football. The team will enter the Greek Football Cup in the First round and will also enter in UEFA Cup  starting from the First round.

Players

Squad

Transfers

Players transferred in

Players transferred out

Kit

Friendlies

Competitions

Overview

Alpha Ethniki

League table

Results summary

Results by round

Matches

Greek Cup

First round

Second round

Third round

UEFA Cup

First round

Second round

Statistics

Squad statistics

! colspan="13" style="background:#DCDCDC; text-align:center" | Goalkeepers
|-

! colspan="13" style="background:#DCDCDC; text-align:center" | Defenders
|-

	

! colspan="13" style="background:#DCDCDC; text-align:center" | Midfielders
|-

! colspan="13" style="background:#DCDCDC; text-align:center" | Forwards
|-

	

|}

Source: Match reports in competitive matches, uefa.com, epo.gr,  worldfootball.net

Goalscorers

Source: Match reports in competitive matches, uefa.com, epo.gr,  worldfootball.net

External links
 PAOK FC official website

PAOK FC seasons
PAOK